The 1110s was a decade of the Julian Calendar which began on January 1, 1110, and ended on December 31, 1119.

Significant people
 Pope Paschal II
 Al-Mustazhir caliph of Baghdad
 Muhammad Tapar Seljuk sultan

References